Pascal Island may refer to:

 Pascal Island (Antarctica)
 Pascal Island (Western Australia)

See also
 Pascal (disambiguation)